There were few railway stations built in Libya during the 20th century. The ones that were built were done so by the Italians from the 1920s as part of their colonial administration. Today there are no functioning railway stations active in the country, but new ones are planned, as part of a new railroad system.

History
 
Between 1920 and 1936 the Italians built some five small railways in Italian Libya. Served by a host of small stations. Indeed, the Kingdom of Italy built in Libya nearly 400 km of railways with  gauge.

Nearly 40 small and big railways stations were built in Libya by the Italians, when they ruled Libya. The biggest and most important was the one of Italian Tripoli. In 1965 were closed the last remaining stations in Benghazi and Soluch. Actually no one is active, but there it is a huge project of building new ones with modern railways, contracted by Chinese and Russians under former dictator Kaddafi.

By the 1960s there were only two small railways in Libya, departing from Benghazi and serving classical Littorine: Benghazi-Barce and Benghazi-Soluch. In 1965 last remaining stations in Benghazi and Soluch closed. Today no active railway exists in Libya.

Tripoli Station

Tripoli station in the capital Tripoli, was the main terminal for western Libya, not far away from the port and the "Fiera internazionale di Tripoli". The station was connected to the stations of Zuara, Tagiura and Garian by small but very active railways.

Benghazi Station

Benghazi station was the second in importance, located in downtown Benghazi. It closed in 1963, when the last small railway of former Italian Libya the Benghazi-Solluch line was closed and dismantled.

Secondary Stations
Other important railways stations were those in:

 Barce
 Zuara
 Garian
 Soluch
 Tagiura

New railway stations 

Plans for a new rail network, complete with stations have been under development for some time since the end of the 20th century. In the first years of the 21st century an ambitious railway plan was drawn up, with the support of former dictator Gaddafi. With backing from Russian Railways and China work started in September 2008 with earthworks begun between Sirte and Ras Ajdir, Tunisia border, in 2001-5, and in 2008 and 2009 various contracts were placed and construction work started on a  standard gauge railway parallel to the coast from the Tunisian border at Ras Ajdir to Tripoli, and on to Misrata, Sirte, Benghazi and Bayda. Another railway line will run inland from Misrata to Sabha at the centre of a mineral-rich area. However, due to the ongoing conflict as a result of the Libyan Civil War, no new work on the rail network has been carried out since 2012.

Notes

Bibliography
 Le ferrovie coloniali italiane in Libia (in Italian)

See also
Italian Libya Railways
Italian Libya

Italian Libya
Rail transport in Libya
Economic history of Libya